Christopher Hooley  (7 August 1928 – 13 December 2018) was a British mathematician, professor of mathematics at Cardiff University.

He did his PhD under the supervision of Albert Ingham.  He won the Adams Prize of Cambridge University in 1973.  He was elected a Fellow of the Royal Society in 1983. He was also a Founding Fellow of the Learned Society of Wales.

He showed that the Hasse principle holds for non-singular cubic forms in at least nine variables.

References

External links
 

1928 births
2018 deaths
20th-century British mathematicians
21st-century British mathematicians
Academics of Cardiff University
Fellows of the Learned Society of Wales
Fellows of the Royal Society
Number theorists
Alumni of Corpus Christi College, Cambridge